Himle may refer to:

Himle (locality), locality in Varberg Municipality, Sweden
Himle Hundred, a hundred of Sweden

People with the surname Himle
Erick Clausen Himle (1930-1910), American politician and farmer
Erik Himle (1924–2008), Norwegian civil servant and politician
John Himle (born 1954), American politician and businessman
Thorstein Himle (1857–1925), Norwegian-born American missionary

See also
Himley